Sabari is a 2023 Indian Telugu-language action thriller and Family-drama film written and directed by Anilkatz. It stars Varalaxmi Sarathkumar in the titular role alongside Mime Gopi, Ganesh Venkatraman, and Shashank.The film score was composed by Gopi Sundar, while the cinematography Nani Chamidishetty and Rahul Shrivatsav, editing were handled by Dharmendra Kakarala respectively.

Plot 
Sanjana(Varalaxmi Sarathkumar), an independent single mom goes to any length to protect her daughter from an unseen, un known monster from her past

Cast 

 Varalaxmi Sarathkumar as Sanjana 
 Shashank
 Ganesh Venkatraman
 Mime Gopi
 Madhunandan
 Sunaina Badam
 Keshav Deepak
 Rajashri Nair
 Ashritha Vemuganti
 Archana Ananth
 Krishnateja
 Viva Raghava

References

External links 
 
Films shot in Hyderabad, India
Indian action thriller films
Films set in Hyderabad, India
2023 action thriller films
2020s Telugu-language films
2023 films